The Mayor of Colombo is the Mayor (and head) of the Colombo Municipal Council. The post was created in 1866 when the Colombo Municipal Council was established by the Legislative Council of Ceylon. The Mayor is assisted by the Deputy Mayor and a Municipal Commissioner. Since 1944 the majority of the mayors have been from the United National Party.

Election
The mayor is elected in a general election held under the Local Authority Election Ordinance from the party gaining the highest number of seats in the municipal council. Once elected the mayor may hold office for four years.

Powers and functions
Most powers are derived from the Municipal Council Ordinance No. 29 of 1947. The Mayor serves as the chief executive of the municipal council.

The municipal council is responsible for:
Social service
Health and environmental issues
Emergency services (not policing, which is the responsibility of the central government)
Urban planning
Sanitation (waste, sewage)

Rights and privileges
The mayoral office is located at the Colombo Town Hall and the official mayoral residence is Sirinivasa. The mayor's legal title is His/Her Worship the Mayor of Colombo.

Under the provisions of the Municipal Councils Ordinance the mayor and deputy mayor are ex-official Justice of the Peace and Unofficial Magistrates for the administrative district in which the municipality is situated for the duration of their tenure. This is provided so that the mayor or deputy mayor may preside over the municipal magistrate's court.

Official dress
On formal occasions the Mayor wears a scarlet gown with the Mayoral Chain of Office.

Salary
The Mayor of Colombo's salary is Rs 30,000 per month, which is same of all mayors of municipalities in Sri Lanka.

List of mayors
Parties

References

Sources

External links
 Colombo Municipal Council

 
Mayors
Colombo